Katharina Elisabeth Schützenhöfer (born 22 September 1993) is an Austrian professional beach volleyball player who plays as a right-side defender with her partner Lena Plesiutschnig. She won the silver medal at the first ever European Games in 2015. Her first and only FIVB World Tour victory so far, came at a 3-star event in Mersin in 2018. She won a silver medal at the 2011 U19 World Championship and a bronze medal at the 2013 U21 World Championship, both competitions were held in Umag. She is also the 2011 U20 European Champion with Plesiutschnig.

Career podiums

FIVB World Tour
 3 medals – (1 gold, 1 silver, 1 bronze)

CEV European Tour
 2 medals – (1 silver, 1 bronze)

References

External links

 Schützenhöfer / Plesiutschnig Official Site 
 
 Katharina Schützenhöfer at the Beach Volleyball Major Series
 

1993 births
Living people
Austrian beach volleyball players
Beach volleyball defenders
People from Oberwart
Beach volleyball players at the 2015 European Games
European Games medalists in beach volleyball
European Games silver medalists for Austria
Sportspeople from Burgenland
21st-century Austrian women